Herbert Druce, FLS (14 July 1846, in London – 11 April 1913, in London) was an English entomologist. 

His collections were acquired by Frederick DuCane Godman (1834–1919), Osbert Salvin (1835–1898), and James John Joicey (1870–1932) before being bequeathed to the Natural History Museum, London. He is not to be confused with his son, the English entomologist Hamilton Herbert Druce (1869 – 21 June 1922), who also worked on Lepidoptera.

Partial list of publications
 Druce, H., 1872 with  Arthur Gardiner Butler (1844–1925), Descriptions of new genera and species of Lepidoptera from Costa Rica. Cistula entomologica, 1 : 95–118. (1872)
 Druce, H., 1873. A list of the Collections of Diurnal Lepidoptera made by Mr. Lowe in Borneo. Proceedings of the Zoological Society of London 1873: 337–361, 2 pls. text plates. 
 Druce, H., 1874. A list of the lepidopterous insects collected by Mr. L. Layard in Siam Proceedings of the Zoological Society of London1874(1): 102–109, pl. 16
 Druce, H. 1875 A list of the collection of diurnal lepidoptera made by Mr. J.J. Monteiro, in Angola, with descriptions of some new species. Proceedings of the Zoological Society of London 1875:406–417. 
 Druce, H. 1887  Descriptions of some new species of Lepidoptera Heterocera, mostly from tropical Africa. - Proc. Zoological Society of London 1887:668–686, pl. 55
 Druce, H. 1894 Descriptions of some new species of Heterocera from Central America Ann. Mag. Nat. Hist. (6) 13 : 168-182 
 Druce, H. 1894. Descriptions of new species of Agaristidae. - Annals and Magazine of Natural History (6)14:21–24.
 Druce, H. 1889 Descriptions of new Species of Lepidoptera, chiefly from Central America Ann. Mag. Nat. Hist. (6) 4 (19) : 77–94
 Druce, H. 1910a. Descriptions of some new species of Heterocera from tropical Africa. - Annals and Magazine of Natural History (8)5:393–402.
 Druce, H. 1911b. Descriptions of some new species of Heterocera, chiefly from tropical South America. - Annals and Magazine of Natural History (8)8:136–150
 Druce, H. 1912a. Descriptions of seven new species of Heterocera belonging to the subfamily Ophiusinae. - Annals and Magazine of Natural History (8)9:552–554.

Sources

Translation from French Wikipedia.

Joicey, J. J.; Talbot, G., eds. (1924). The Bulletin of the Hill Museum: A Magazine of Lepidoptera. 1. London: John Bale, Sons and Danielsson Ltd. p. 3.

1846 births
1913 deaths
English lepidopterists
Scientists from London
19th-century English scientists
20th-century English scientists